Mohe or variation, may refer to:

Mohe people, a Tungusic people of ancient Manchuria
Heishui Mohe, a Mohe tribe
Mohe City, a county-level city in Daxing'anling, Heilongjiang
 Ministry of Higher Education

See also